Gregory v. Helvering, 293 U.S. 465 (1935), was a landmark decision by the United States Supreme Court concerned with U.S. income tax law. The case is cited as part of the basis for two legal doctrines: the business purpose doctrine and the doctrine of substance over form. The business purpose doctrine is essentially that if a transaction has no substantial business purpose other than the avoidance or reduction of Federal tax, the tax law will not regard the transaction. The doctrine of substance over form is essentially that for Federal tax purposes, a taxpayer is bound by the economic substance of a transaction if the economic substance varies from its legal form.

Facts
Evelyn Gregory was the owner of all the shares of a company called United Mortgage Company ("United"). United Mortgage in turn owned 1,000 shares of stock of a company called Monitor Securities Corporation ("Monitor"). On September 18, 1928, she created Averill Corp and, three days after, transferred the 1000 shares in Monitor to Averill. On September 24, she dissolved Averill and distributed the 1000 shares in Monitor to herself, and on the same day sold the shares for $133,333.33. She claimed there was a cost of $57,325.45, and she should be taxed on a capital net gain on $76,007.88. On her 1928 federal income tax return, Gregory treated the transaction as a tax free corporate reorganization, under the Revenue Act of 1928 section 112. The Commissioner of Internal Revenue, Guy T. Helvering, argued in economic substance there was no business reorganization, that Gregory owned all three corporations and was simply following a legal form to make it appear like a reorganization so she could dispose of the Monitor shares without paying substantial income tax. Accordingly, she understated her liability by $10,000.

Judgment
In the ensuing litigation, the Board of Tax Appeals (a predecessor to today's United States Tax Court) ruled in favor of the taxpayer. See Gregory v. Commissioner, 27 B.T.A. 223 (1932).

Second Circuit
On appeal, the United States Court of Appeals for the Second Circuit reversed the Board of Tax Appeals, ruling in favor of the Commissioner. Learned Hand J said the following in the course of his judgment.

Supreme Court
The Supreme Court of the United States also ruled in favor of the Commissioner. Although the letter of the law might arguably have been complied with, the intention of the Act was not to allow reorganizations merely for the purpose of tax avoidance. In the course of its judgment, the Court said the following.

See also
 List of United States Supreme Court cases, volume 293

References

Further reading

External links

1935 in United States case law
United States Supreme Court cases
United States Supreme Court cases of the Hughes Court
United States taxation and revenue case law
Tax evasion in the United States